The Texas Rangers 2000 season involved the Rangers finishing 4th in the American League West with a record of 71 wins and 91 losses.

Preseason
November 2, 1999: Juan González was traded by the Texas Rangers with Danny Patterson and Gregg Zaun to the Detroit Tigers for Frank Catalanotto, Francisco Cordero, Bill Haselman, Gabe Kapler, Justin Thompson, and Alan Webb (minors).
January 10, 2000: Jason McDonald signed with the Rangers as a free agent.

Regular season

Opening Day Starters

Iván Rodríguez, C
Rafael Palmeiro, 1B
Luis Alicea, 2B
Tom Evans, 3B
Royce Clayton, SS
Rusty Greer, LF
Rubén Mateo, CF
Gabe Kapler, RF
David Segui, DH
Kenny Rogers, LHP

Season standings

Record vs. opponents

Transactions
July 3, 2000: Mark Clark was released by the Texas Rangers.
July 19, 2000: Esteban Loaiza was traded by the Texas Rangers to the Toronto Blue Jays for Darwin Cubillán and Michael Young.
July 28, 2000: Ricky Ledée was traded by the Cleveland Indians to the Texas Rangers for David Segui.

Roster

Player stats

Batting

Starters by position
Note: Pos = Position; G = Games played; AB = At bats; H = Hits; Avg. = Batting average; HR = Home runs; RBI = Runs batted in

Other batters
Note: G = Games played; AB = At bats; H = Hits; Avg. = Batting average; HR = Home runs; RBI = Runs batted in

Pitching

Starting pitchers
Note: G = Games pitched; IP = Innings pitched; W = Wins; L = Losses; ERA = Earned run average; SO = Strikeouts

Other pitchers 
Note: G = Games pitched; IP = Innings pitched; W = Wins; L = Losses; ERA = Earned run average; SO = Strikeouts

Relief pitchers 
Note: G = Games pitched; W = Wins; L = Losses; SV = Saves; ERA = Earned run average; SO = Strikeouts

Awards and honors
Iván Rodríguez, C, Gold Glove
Kenny Rogers, P, Gold Glove
All-Star Game

Farm system 

LEAGUE CHAMPIONS: GCL Rangers

References

2000 Texas Rangers team page at Baseball Reference
2000 Texas Rangers team page at www.baseball-almanac.com

Texas Rangers seasons
Range
Texas Rangers